Peter Standish Burke  (22 September 1927 – 2 October 2017) was a New Zealand rugby union player, coach and administrator. He played 12 matches for the All Blacks including three internationals.

After retiring as a player, Burke went on to contribute to rugby as a selector, coach and administrator. He was a Taranaki selector from 1960 to 1968, and assistant coach of that union from 1963 to 1965. He also served as president of the Taranaki Rugby Union. From 1970 to 1975 he was a North Island selector and he became a New Zealand selector in 1978. Burke was the All Blacks coach during the 1981 Springbok Tour and also for the tour of Romania and France later that year. In 1994 he served as president of the New Zealand Rugby Union.

In the 1997 Queen's Birthday Honours, Burke was appointed an Officer of the New Zealand Order of Merit, for services to rugby.

The Peter Burke Trophy, named in Burke's honour, is contested between the Bay of Plenty and Taranaki representative rugby union teams.

References

 

1927 births
2017 deaths
Rugby union players from Tauranga
People educated at Tauranga Boys' College
New Zealand rugby union players
New Zealand international rugby union players
Bay of Plenty rugby union players
Auckland rugby union players
Taranaki rugby union players
Rugby union locks
Rugby union number eights
New Zealand national rugby union team coaches
New Zealand Rugby Football Union officials
Officers of the New Zealand Order of Merit